Tetratricopeptide repeat protein 3 is a protein that in humans is encoded by the TTC3 gene.

References

Further reading